"Losin Control" is a song by American rapper Russ. It was released on his SoundCloud page on November 9, 2015. Russ included this song on his debut studio album There's Really a Wolf. The song was mixed, mastered, engineered, produced, written, and performed by Russ.

Background
Russ debuted the music video to "Losin Control" through his Vevo account on February 1, 2016. As of April 2022, the song has over 361 million views on YouTube.

Commercial performance
"Losin Control" debuted at number 89 US Billboard Hot 100 chart on March 18, 2017 chart week. The song eventually peaked at number 62 on the chart. "Losin Control" is Russ' second song to appear on the Billboard Hot 100 following "What They Want". On June 29, 2017, the single was certified platinum by the Recording Industry Association of America (RIAA) for sales of over a million digital copies in the United States. On August 23, 2018, the single was certified triple platinum for sales of over three million digital copies in the United States.

Charts

Weekly charts

Year-end charts

Certifications

References

External links

2017 singles
2017 songs
Russ (rapper) songs
Columbia Records singles